A with diaeresis and macron (Ӓ̄ ӓ̄; italics: Ӓ̄ ӓ̄) is a letter of the Cyrillic script. In all its forms it looks exactly like the Latin letter A with diaeresis and macron (Ǟ ǟ Ǟ ǟ).

A with diaeresis and macron is used only in the alphabet of the Kildin Sami language where it represents a lengthened palatalized open front unrounded vowel .

See also
Ǟ ǟ : Latin letter Ǟ
Cyrillic characters in Unicode

Cyrillic letters with diacritics
Letters with diaeresis